Gyeonggi Province (Gyeonggi-do) is divided into 28 cities (si) and 3 counties (gun). Listed below is each entity's name in English, hangul and hanja.

Cities

Counties

List by Population and Area

General information

See also 
 List of cities in South Korea

Gyeonggi
Gyeonggi